In the 1977 Virginia gubernatorial election, incumbent Governor Mills E. Godwin, Jr., a Republican, was unable to seek re-election due to term limits. John N. Dalton, the Lieutenant Governor of Virginia, was nominated by the Republican Party to run against the Democratic nominee, former Lieutenant Governor of Virginia Henry Howell.

, this was the most recent Virginia gubernatorial election in which a Republican won Richmond  Arlington County and the city of Falls Church, as well as the most recent one in which both major party candidates are now deceased.

Candidates
John N. Dalton, Lieutenant Governor of Virginia (R)
Henry Howell, former Lieutenant Governor of Virginia (D), who defeated Attorney General Andrew P. Miller.

Results

References

Gubernatorial
1977
Virginia
Virginia gubernatorial election